Derrytresk Fir An Chnoic is a Gaelic Athletic Association club in Tyrone. The club is based in the townland of Derrytresk near Clonoe in County Tyrone, Northern Ireland.

Gaelic football
The club concentrates on Gaelic football, with the senior team currently competing in Division 3 of the Tyrone All-County Football League and in the Tyrone Junior Football Championship.

Although one of the smallest clubs in the county, with a catchment area of about 60 houses, Derrytresk won the 2011 Tyrone JFC, defeating Killeeshil 0-15 to 0-9. They went on to win the Ulster Junior Club Football Championship, defeating Monaghan's Cremartin 2-5 to 0-10. They won their All-Ireland semi-final against Kerry's Dromid Pearses (1-10 to 7 points), but narrowly lost the final in February 2012 to Naomh Pádraig of Galway.

The club has at times played in the Senior Championship, reaching the final in 1949 when they were defeated by An Charraig Mhór.

Honours
Tyrone Senior Football Championship
(runners-up) 1949
Tyrone Junior Football Championship (2)
1955, 2011
Ulster Junior Club Football Championship 
 2011
All-Ireland Junior Club Football Championship
(runners-up) 2011
Tyrone Junior Football League (3)
1987, 1992, 1994

Notable players
Mick Cushnahan (died 2013), member of Tyrone's 1947 All-Ireland Minor winning team, and (after transfer to Derrylaughan) the 1956-57 Ulster Championship winning teams

Camogie
An associated camogie club called Cailíní a' Chnoic plays at the same home venue.

References

 
 

Gaelic games clubs in County Tyrone
Gaelic football clubs in County Tyrone